Pixel Pinkie is an Australian children's animated television series produced and created by Blue Rocket Productions in association with the Nine Network and principally funded by The Film Finance Corporation Australia. It aired from 29 August 2009 to 15 September 2012. The show was critically panned.

Plot
Pixel Pinkie is about two girls, Nina and Anni. During the first episode, Nina moves in to a new town where she meets Anni and gets a mobile cellphone with a digital genie named Pixel Pinkie in it which can make her wishes come true, but they both have to keep it a secret. Each episode sees Nina wishing for something from Pixel Pinkie, and when they offend her when her wish goes wrong, both Nina and Anni have to solve their problem alone.

Cast
 Jane Binning - Pixel Pinkie
 Anica Boulanger-Mashberg - Anni
 Magdalena Grubski - Nina
 Jemma Gates - Suzi
 Sara Cooper - Max
 Nick Storr - Coolest Luke

Production
There have been two series developed with 52 twelve-minute episodes. In Australia the twelve-minute episodes are joined to make 12 twenty-six-minute episodes in each series. The first series was developed in 2007 and first aired in 2009.

Episodes

Series 1

Series 2

References

External links

2009 Australian television series debuts
2009 Australian television series endings
Australian children's animated television series
Australian children's animated comedy television series
Australian children's animated fantasy television series
Australian flash animated television series
English-language television shows
Nine Network original programming
Animated television series about children